Theano may refer to:

Theano (Θεανώ), Ancient Greek given name:
Theano, name of several figures in Greek mythology
Theano, one of the Leuctrides
Theano (philosopher), historical female philosopher
Theano, lyric poetess from Locris
Theano (software), a numerical computational library